Fenestrelle is a comune (municipality) in the Metropolitan City of Turin in the Italian region Piedmont, located about  west of Turin.

It is the location of the Fenestrelle Fort, an alpine fortification which guarded the route between the Kingdom of France and the Duchy of Savoy.

References

External links
 Official website

Cities and towns in Piedmont